Fagg is a surname. Notable people with the surname include:

Arthur Fagg, (1915–1977), English cricketer
Bernard Fagg (1915–1987), British archaeologist and museum curator
Fred D. Fagg, Jr., President of the University of Southern California from 1947 to 1957 
Fred D. Fagg III (1934–2002), law school dean 
George Gardner Fagg (1934–2015), US federal judge
Harrison Fagg (born 1931), American politician
Jimmy Fagg (born 1929), English stand-up comedian, musician and actor
Sir John Fagg, 1st Baronet (1627–1701), English politician
Keith Fagg (born 1955), Australian businessman and politician
Kenneth S. Fagg (1901–1980), American commercial artist
Peter Fagg (1837–1917), American politician
Russell Fagg, (born 1960), American judge and politician
William Buller Fagg (1914–1992), British art historian and museum keeper